The Best of Buck Owens is a compilation album by Buck Owens, released in 1964. It reached Number two on the Billboard Country Albums charts and Number 46 on the Pop Albums charts. It also peaked at No. 1 in Norway and stayed on the charts for 222 weeks there, becoming the most successful album of all time in that country.

It is out of print although all the songs are available on other Owens compilations.

Track listing

Side one
 "Love's Gonna Live Here" (Buck Owens)
 "Foolin' Around" (Harlan Howard, Owens)
 "Excuse Me (I Think I've Got a Heartache)" (Owens)
 "I Can't Stop My Lovin' You" (Owens, Don Rich)
 "Kickin' Our Hearts Around" (Wanda Jackson)
 "Under the Influence of Love" (Howard, Owens)

Side two
 "Act Naturally" (Johnny Russell, Voni Morrison)
 "Under Your Spell Again" (Owens, Dusty Rhodes)
 "Above and Beyond" (Howard)
 "Second Fiddle" (Owens)
 "Nobody's Fool But Yours" (Owens)
 "High as the Mountains" (Owens)

References

Buck Owens albums
1964 greatest hits albums
Capitol Records compilation albums
Albums produced by Ken Nelson (United States record producer)